Hong Kong Second Division League is the third level of football league in Hong Kong founded in 1909. The top two teams are promoted to the Hong Kong First Division.

Competition format
 Each team plays the other teams twice, one home and one away game. The ticket profits go to the home team. If there are two matches in the same stadium on the day, the profits are shared between the two home teams.
 Since most of the teams do not have a home ground, the matches will be playing on different grounds. It happens that one team plays their home games in different stadiums in the same season.
 The bottom two teams are relegated to the Hong Kong Third Division.

Past winners

Before World War II

After World War II

As a 3rd Tier League

See also
 The Hong Kong Football Association

References

External links
 HKFA website
 Club Profiles
 www.GoalGoalGoal.com
 Hong Kong Football

  
3
Third level football leagues in Asia
1909 establishments in Hong Kong
Sports leagues established in 1909